Vladimirovka is a rural locality (a selo) in Ust-Ivanovsky Selsoviet of Blagoveshchensky District, Amur Oblast, Russia. The population was 1,031 as of 2018. There are 77 streets.

Geography 
Vladimirovka is located on the left bank of the Zeya River, 12 km east of Blagoveshchensk (the district's administrative centre) by road. Blagoveshchensk is the nearest rural locality.

References 

Rural localities in Blagoveshchensky District, Amur Oblast